Angelo Galea (born 26 March 1976 in Malta) is a retired professional footballer.  He played as defender.

Playing career
Angelo "Lino" Galea played for Valletta, Sliema Wanderers, Birkirkara and Tarxien Rainbows and was once a Maltese international. Galea won the 2005 and 2008 Maltese Cups with Bikirkara.

References

External links
 

Living people
1976 births
Maltese footballers
Malta international footballers
Association football defenders
Valletta F.C. players
Sliema Wanderers F.C. players
Birkirkara F.C. players
Tarxien Rainbows F.C. players